Daniela Kluckert ( Lange, born 22 December 1980) is a German politician of the Free Democratic Party (FDP) who has been serving as a member of the Bundestag from the state of Berlin since 2017.

In addition to her parliamentary work, Kluckert has been serving as Parliamentary State Secretary in the Federal Ministry of Transport and Digital Infrastructure in the coalition government of Chancellor Olaf Scholz since 2021. In this capacity, she is also the Federal Commissioner for the Infrastructure of Charging Stations.

Early life and career 
Kluckert was born in Nürnberg, Bavaria, but grew up in Weißenborn. After graduating from high school in 2002, she began studying economics at the University of Würzburg and the Free University of Berlin, where she graduated with a diploma. 

From 2009 to 2013 Kluckert worked as an assistant to Christiane Ratjen-Damerau, a member of the German Bundestag. Afterwards she worked as an adviser for Saxony’s State Ministry for Economic Affairs, based at the state’s representative office in Berlin.

Political career 
Kluckert joined the FDP in 2005. She became a member of the Bundestag in the 2017 German federal election, representing Berlin-Pankow. In parliament, she served as deputy chairwoman of the Committee on Transport and Digital Infrastructure from 2018 until 2021.

References

External links 

  
 Bundestag biography 
 

 

 

1980 births
Living people
Members of the Bundestag for Berlin
Female members of the Bundestag
21st-century German women politicians
Members of the Bundestag 2021–2025
Members of the Bundestag 2017–2021
Members of the Bundestag for the Free Democratic Party (Germany)
Free University of Berlin alumni